Mozaffar Firouz (6 August 1906 – 5 April 1988) was the eldest son of prince Firouz Mirza Nosrat-ed-Dowleh Farman Farmaian III by his first wife. Born in Tehran on 6 August 1906, he attended in Harrow School and Cambridge University. He worked in the Iranian embassy in Washington, D.C., from 1928 to 1930 and represented Iran at the International Aeronautical conference in 1928. He was minister of labour in 1946 and ambassador to the USSR from 1946–1947. He married Princess Mahin Dowlatshahi in 1937. He fled Iran during the 1979 revolution to France and died in Paris on 5 April 1988.

He was editor of the newspaper Rad Emrouz from 1942–1945.

References

Further reading
 Qajar Nobles and Notables, Nosrat ed-Dowleh Farmanfarmaian, Qajar pages.2010.
 Family tree of Farmanfarmaian family by M. M. Eskandari-Qajar, Qajar pages.2010.

1906 births
1988 deaths
People educated at Harrow School
Alumni of the University of Cambridge
Democrat Party of Iran politicians
National Will Party politicians
Farmanfarmaian family
Iranian emigrants to France
Iranian expatriates in the United Kingdom
Iranian expatriates in the United States
Qajar princes
Politicians from Tehran